Stringer may refer to:

Structural elements
 Stringer (aircraft), or longeron, a strip of wood or metal to which the skin of an aircraft is fastened
 Stringer (slag), an inclusion, possibly leading to a defect, in cast metal
 Stringer (stairs), the structural member in a stairway that supports the treads and risers
 Stringer (surfing), a thin piece of wood running from nose to tail of a surfboard

Other uses
 Stringer (name), includes a list of people with the name
 Stringer (journalism), a type of freelance journalist
 Stringer, Mississippi, an unincorporated community
 Fish stringer, a piece of cord or chain used to keep fish alive and secured while an angler continues fishing
 The Stringers, nickname of Hailsham Town F.C., English football club

See also 
 Stranger (disambiguation)
 Strenger
 String (disambiguation)